Sweet and Hot is a 1958 short subject directed by Jules White starring American slapstick comedy team The Three Stooges (Moe Howard, Larry Fine and Joe Besser). It is the 186th entry in the series released by Columbia Pictures starring the comedians, who released 190 shorts for the studio between 1934 and 1959.

Plot
Small town boy made good, producer Larry returns to his home farm town. There he hears and watches as his friends Joe and sister Tiny (Muriel Landers) work on their farm. Talented Tiny is singing. As she sings, the animals in the barn move to the beat. After hearing Tiny finish her song, Larry asks them to join his New York nightclub act. But Tiny has a fear of performing in front of a live audience, so Larry and Joe take Tiny to a German psychiatrist (Moe), who uses hypnosis to take Tiny back to the childhood origin of her problem.

At the psychiatrist's office, Tiny, under hypnosis, reveals that she has been scared since an incident in her family's barn. She was singing and pretending to play on a piano in front of her father (Moe) when her uncles (Larry and Joe) come inside to listen to her singing and applaud when she finishes. Moe demands she sings more for them. Tiny refuses and hides in fear. After being scared again, the psychiatrist convinces a hypnotized Tiny that she should sing because people love hearing her sing. Tiny agrees and is cured of her fear. She becomes a professional singer, making her debut onstage with Joe and Larry. Tiny sings while Larry plays a violin and Joe dances. The audience gives their applause and Tiny is happy.

Cast
 Moe Howard as Dr. Hugo Gansamacher and Horace
 Larry Fine as Larry and Uncle Louie
 Joe Besser as Joe and Uncle Joe
 Muriel Landers as Tiny

Production notes
Sweet and Hot was filmed over two days on August 22–23, 1957. Closing musical number "The Heat is On" featuring Landers performing alone was stock footage taken from her own solo 1957 Columbia short Tricky Chicks. The shot of a duck quacking was lifted from I'm a Monkey's Uncle.

Sweet and Hot features Moe and Larry's more "gentlemanly" haircuts, first suggested by Joe Besser. However, these had to be used sparingly, as most of the shorts with Besser were remakes of earlier films, and new footage had to be matched with old.

Over the course of their 24 years at Columbia Pictures, the Stooges would occasionally be cast as separate characters. This course of action always worked against the team; author Jon Solomon concluded "when the writing divides them, they lose their comic dynamic." In addition to this split occurring in Sweet and Hot, the trio also played separate characters in Rockin' in the Rockies, Cuckoo on a Choo Choo, Flying Saucer Daffy, Gypped in the Penthouse, He Cooked His Goose, and its remake Triple Crossed.

Moe uses a heavy German accent to play the psychiatrist, the same one he used to mock Adolf Hitler in You Nazty Spy! and They Stooge to Conga over a decade earlier.

See also
 List of American films of 1958

References

External links 
 
 
Sweet and Hot at threestooges.net

1958 films
1958 comedy films
The Three Stooges films
American black-and-white films
Films directed by Jules White
Columbia Pictures short films
1950s English-language films
1950s American films